Nils Johan Schjander (April 9, 1931 – February 9, 2009) was a Norwegian author, manager, and editor. 

Schjander was born in Oslo. He wrote several books about administration and leadership, and he made his debut in fiction in 1984 with the novel Menn gråter ikke (Men Do Not Cry). He was the son of Fredrik Severin Schjander and Nora Marta Schjander (née Kristensen), and the grandson of the engineer Nils Johan Schjander, a member of the Kristiania Bohemians. Schjander is buried in the cemetery at Ullern Church.

Works
 Tett på 60 norske toppledere, 1998, Pantagruel forlag
 Mannsekspressen, novel, 1998, Pantagruel forlag
 Hvis jeg bare hadde en bedre sjef, 1995, Hjemmets bokforlag
 Tårer for en sønn, 1994, Aschehoug
 Når katastrofen rammer, 1990, Hjemmets bokforlag
 Milliardene som ble borte: en dokumentarroman, 1989, Damm
 If I only had a better boss: George Kenning on management, 1988, Damm
 Personalansvar, 1987, NKS-forlaget
 Leder og menneske, 1987, Hjemmets bokforlag
 Takk, bare bra, novel, 1986, Atheneum
 Menn gråter ikke, novel, 1984, Atheneum
 Administrasjon av personale, 1974, NKS-forlaget
 Mannen i midten: en formanns personalproblemer, 1972, NKS-forlaget
 Administrasjon av personale, 1971, NKS-forlaget

References

Norwegian male writers
1931 births
2009 deaths
Writers from Bærum